Sherman Day (1806–1884) was born in New Haven, Connecticut and died in Berkeley, California. He attended Phillips Academy, Andover and graduated from Yale College, A.B., 1826, receiving the degree from his father, Jeremiah Day (1773–1867), who was president of Yale from 1817–1846. He was also the grandson of the American founding father Roger Sherman.

Biography
After his graduation he lived in New York and Philadelphia for a time, as a merchant. For several years he was in Ohio and Indiana as an engineer. In 1843, he published Historical Collections of the State of Pennsylvania. He came to California in 1849, and engaged in civil and mining engineering at San Jose, New Almaden, Folsom and Oakland.

In 1855 he made for the state a survey of wagon-road routes across the Sierra Nevada; California State Senate, 1855–56; United States Surveyor General, California, 1868–71; original trustees, University of California, Professor, Mine Construction and Surveying.

Sherman Day's Historical Collections of Pennsylvania is considered one of the most important documentations of early histories of Pennsylvania, mostly because it included individual histories for all the counties within the Keystone State. As well, it contained a series of wonderful images (produced by Sherman as well) of all parts of the Keystone State.

"We are more familiar with the history of England, Rome or Greece' and with the career of Alexander, Caesar and Napoleon than with the events that have occurred in our own vicinity. Yes, even in the very fields that we ourselves are tilling."

External links 
 
Rocking Chair 
Sherman Day Find A Grave
Obituary of Sherman Day, Class of 1826, in 1885 Yale College Obituary Record
1885 Annual Report, Surveyor General, State of California
Up and Down California 1860-1864
Santa Clara Co. 1. Thompson & West; Day, Sherman, 1806-1884, 1876
Brief History of the University of California 
Yale alumni in the Gold Rush
Mission San Gabriel Arcángel - ArcGIS StoryMaps 
Sherman Day, New Almaden Mine Main Tunnel Entrance
Watkins # 145 Into the Tunnel
Sherman Day, artist, forty-niner, engineer by Murphy D. Smith

 

19th-century American historians
19th-century American male writers
1806 births
1884 deaths
American surveyors
Phillips Academy alumni
Writers from New Haven, Connecticut
Yale College alumni
California state senators
19th-century American politicians
American male non-fiction writers
Historians from Connecticut